Gaucelmus is a genus of spiders in the family Nesticidae. It was first described in 1884 by Keyserling. , it contains 6 species.

Species
Gaucelmus comprises the following species:
Gaucelmus augustinus Keyserling, 1884
Gaucelmus calidus Gertsch, 1971
Gaucelmus cavernicola (Petrunkevitch, 1910)
Gaucelmus pygmaeus Gertsch, 1984
Gaucelmus strinatii Brignoli, 1979
Gaucelmus tropicus Gertsch, 1984

References

Nesticidae
Araneomorphae genera
Spiders of North America
Spiders of Central America
Taxa named by Eugen von Keyserling